New Quay and similar may refer to:
 New Quay, residential precinct in Melbourne Docklands, Australia
 Newquay or New Quay, County Clare, seaside town in County Clare, Ireland
 United Kingdom:
 New Quay, seaside town in Ceredigion, Wales
 Newquay, town in Cornwall, England
 New Quay (Devon), small abandoned port in Devon